Crell's Annalen is a German chemistry journal. Its original name is Chemische Annalen für die Freunde der Naturlehre, Arzneygelährtheit, Haushaltungskunst und Manufacturen, which is usually shortened to Chemische Annalen and often referred to as Crell's Annalen after the editor Lorenz Florenz Friedrich von Crell (1744–1816), professor of theoretical medicine and materia medica at the University of Helmstedt; it was first published in 1778.

References

Further reading
Karl Hufbauer (1982) The Formation of the German Chemical Community. Berkeley, Los Angeles, London: University of California Press.
(Reviewed by Henry Lowood Eighteenth-Century Studies, Vol. 18, No. 1. (Autumn, 1984), pp. 108-112)

Chemistry journals
Publications established in 1778